Francis Gerald Vesey   or Veasey (15 July 1832 – 18 March 1915)  was a priest of the Church of England. He was the Archdeacon of Huntingdon from 1874 to 1915.

He was educated at Windlesham House School, Harrow and Trinity College, Cambridge, graduating BA in 1855 and MA in 1858. He was a curate at  Great St Mary's, Cambridge and then Rector of St John's Huntingdon from 1858 to 1874 before becoming archdeacon of Huntingdon.

References

1832 births
People educated at Harrow School
Alumni of Trinity College, Cambridge
Archdeacons of Huntingdon
1915 deaths
People educated at Windlesham House School